Kostadin Bashov (born 26 November 1982, in Gotse Delchev) is a Bulgarian footballer who plays as a forward for Ormideia FC in Cypriot Third Division.

Career 
A product of Levski Sofia's youth academy, Bashov progressed to their first-team in 2001. He made five appearances without scoring in his tenure at the club. He had a loan spells at Spartak Pleven, Cherno More Varna and Rodopa Smolyan. Bashov signed for Vidima-Rakovski Sevlievo at the beginning of the 2004–05 season.

In January 2006, Bashov moved to Greece where he played for Ethnikos Piraeus F.C., Diagoras F.C. and Korinthos F.C.

In January 2009, he moved to Cyprus first to play for Olympiakos Nicosia and then for Alki Larnaca.

In August 2012, after six years spent abroad, Bashov returned to the A PFG and signed a contract with Litex Lovech. He made his debut on 25 August 2012, in the 0–0 home draw with Minyor Pernik. In February 2013, after being released from Litex, Bashov agreed terms with Cypriot side AEP Paphos until the end of the season. The Cypriot club was relegated to a lower division and Bashov joined Pirin Gotse Delchev in mid September 2013.

Honours

Club
Levski Sofia
Bulgarian Cup : 2002–03

References

External links
 
 Profile at Levskisofia.info 

1982 births
Living people
Bulgarian footballers
Bulgaria under-21 international footballers
Bulgarian expatriate footballers
PFC Spartak Pleven players
PFC Cherno More Varna players
PFC Levski Sofia players
PFC Rodopa Smolyan players
PFC Vidima-Rakovski Sevlievo players
Ethnikos Piraeus F.C. players
Korinthos F.C. players
Olympiakos Nicosia players
Alki Larnaca FC players
PFC Litex Lovech players
PFC Pirin Gotse Delchev players
Enosis Neon Paralimni FC players
ASIL Lysi players
P.O. Xylotymbou players
Ormideia F.C. players
First Professional Football League (Bulgaria) players
Cypriot First Division players
Cypriot Second Division players
Expatriate footballers in Greece
Expatriate footballers in Cyprus
Association football forwards